Linda Tuhiwai Te Rina Smith  (née Mead; born 1950), previously a professor of indigenous education at the University of Waikato in Hamilton, New Zealand, is now Distinguished Professor at Te Whare Wānanga o Awanuiārangi. The daughter of Sidney Moko Mead, she affiliates to the Ngāti Awa and Ngāti Porou iwi.

Academic career
Smith earned her BA, MA (hons), and PhD degrees at the University of Auckland. Her 1996 thesis was titled Ngā aho o te kakahu matauranga: the multiple layers of struggle by Maori in education. She was a member of the Māori political group Ngā Tamatoa while a university student.

Smith is the author of Decolonizing Methodologies (Zed Books, 1999, 2012, and 2021), a critical analysis of the role of Western scholarly research played in the process of colonization of indigenous cultures.  This work is considered a major contribution to research methods in social justice research.

Smith is the Pro-Vice Chancellor Māori, Dean of the School of Māori and Pacific Development and Director of Te Kotahi Research Institute at the University of Waikato.

In the 2013 New Year Honours, Smith was appointed a Companion of the New Zealand Order of Merit for services to Māori and education. In 2017, Smith was selected as one of the Royal Society Te Apārangi's "150 women in 150 words", celebrating the contributions of women to knowledge in New Zealand.

In November 2016 she was appointed a member of the Waitangi Tribunal. In the same year she retired  Pro Vice Chancellor Māori and took a short-term contract as Professor of Māori and Indigenous Studies in the newly formed Faculty of Māori and Indigenous Studies.

In September 2020 the hashtag #BecauseOfLindaTuhiwaiSmith went viral when Smith was one of a group of academics who wrote an open letter to the Ministry of Education on racism in education and news that her contract would not be renewed. A report commissioned by the University of Waikato into claims in the letter found that the institution is structurally discriminatory against Māori  but did not support other claims in the letter.

In 2021, Smith joined Te Whare Wānanga o Awanuiārangi as Distinguished Professor.

Personal life
Smith was born in Whakatāne, New Zealand. Her father is Sidney Moko Mead of Ngāti Awa, also a professor, and her mother is June Te Rina Mead, née Walker, of Ngāti Porou. She was given the name Tuhiwai as an adult.

When Smith was a teenager, she moved to the US while her father was completing his PhD. Her family lived in southern Illinois and she attended Carbondale Community High School. In her time in the U.S. education system, Smith gained a new found confidence as a learner. Smith later moved to Salem, Massachusetts where she worked as an assistant at the Peabody Museum of Salem, typing labels in the basement. Upon her return to New Zealand, she applied her value of the confidence of students to New Zealand students, especially Maori students.

In the 1970s, Smith was a founding member of the radical group Ngā Tamatoa. She was radicalized by texts by Malcolm X and Frantz Fanon. Her role in Ngā Tamatoa was to communicate with Maori people about the Treaty of Waitangi. Smith saw education as the most important part the Maori struggle for freedom.

Smith is married to fellow academic Graham Smith.

Selected works
 Smith, Linda Tuhiwai. Decolonizing methodologies: Research and indigenous peoples. Zed Books Ltd., 2013.
 Denzin, Norman K., Yvonna S. Lincoln, and Linda Tuhiwai Smith, eds. Handbook of critical and indigenous methodologies. Sage, 2008.
 Smith, Linda Tuhiwai. "On tricky ground: Researching the native in the age of uncertainty. N. Denzin & Y. Lincoln (Eds.) The Landscape of Qualitative Research." (2008): 113–143.
 Smith, Linda Tuhiwai. "Kaupapa maori research." Reclaiming indigenous voice and vision (2000): 225–247.
 Cram, Fiona, Linda Smith, and Wayne Johnstone. "Mapping the themes of Maori talk about health." (2003).
 Smith, Linda Tuhiwai. "Building a research agenda for indigenous epistemologies and education." Anthropology & education quarterly 36, no. 1 (2005): 93–95.

References

Living people
New Zealand educational theorists
21st-century social scientists
New Zealand Māori academics
Academic staff of the University of Waikato
Companions of the New Zealand Order of Merit
Decolonization
Ngāti Awa people
Ngāti Porou people
New Zealand Māori women academics
1950 births
Members of the Waitangi Tribunal
Academic staff of Te Whare Wānanga o Awanuiārangi